The 1924 Detroit Titans football team represented the University of Detroit as an independent during the 1924 college football season. The Titans compiled a 4–5 record and were outscored by opponents by a combined total of 120 to 94.

After retiring as the University of Detroit's head football coach at the end of the 1922 season, James F. Duffy began a law practice. In March 1924, Durfy agreed to return for one year in his old position. Duffy's assistant coaches in 1924 were Steamer Horning (line coach), John Barrett, and Dutch Lauer. Tom Maher was the team captain.

The 1924 season was the program's first with a losing record since the war-shortened 1918 season.

Schedule

References

External links
 1924 University of Detroit football programs

Detroit
Detroit Titans football seasons
Detroit Titans football
Detroit Titans football